Upendra Nath Verma  is an Indian politician. He was elected to the lower House of the Indian Parliament the Lok Sabha from Chatra, Bihar , as a member of the Janata Dal. He was the Union Minister for State, Rural Development.

References

External links
Official biographical sketch in Parliament of India website

Janata Dal politicians
India MPs 1989–1991
India MPs 1991–1996
Lok Sabha members from Bihar